Sydney Lassick (July 23, 1922 – April 12, 2003) was an American character actor perhaps best known for his role as Charlie Cheswick in the feature film One Flew Over The Cuckoo's Nest. Lassick's first name was sometimes spelled Sidney.

Biography
He was born in Chicago, Illinois, to Russian Jewish immigrants. Lassick, who served in the U.S. Navy during World War II, and afterwards studied drama at DePaul University, began acting in both films and TV shows in the late 1950s. 

Lassick is perhaps best known for his portrayal of Charlie Cheswick, a whiny and childish manic depressive patient in the 1975 Academy Award-winning film One Who Flew Over the Cuckoo's Nest. Other memorable roles include a fey Fairy Godfather in the lowbrow Sinderella and the Golden Bra;Mr. Fromm, the spitefully sarcastic English teacher in the 1976 film adaptation of Stephen King's novel Carrie; the perverse and abusive innkeeper Ernest Keller in slasher horror The Unseen; the slimy Charlie P. in the cult film Sonny Boy; and the effeminate lackey Gopher in Deep Cover (1992). Lassick also was the voice of Straycatcher #2 in the 1992 animated feature film Tom and Jerry: The Movie.

In television, Lassick guest starred on such shows as Eight Is Enough, Baretta, Hawaii Five-O, Barney Miller, Matt Houston, Moonlighting, Night Court, Knots Landing, Dream On and The X-Files. While usually a supporting actor, he played the lead in an episode of Amazing Stories called "Remote Control Man."

Though a successful actor, Lassick maintained a steady job as a trucking company's dispatcher throughout his career. He asserted that actors never knew when the acting jobs would stop coming.

Death
Lassick died from complications of diabetes, at age 80 in Los Angeles, California. Lassick was buried in a simple Jewish service, in the southwest Maimonides section, at Mount Sinai Memorial Park Cemetery in Los Angeles, California.

Filmography

The Bonnie Parker Story (1958) as Scout Master 
Paratroop Command (1959) as Interpreter 
Al Capone (1959) as Hot Dog Vendor (uncredited)
Sinderella and the Golden Bra (1964) as Fairy Godfather (as Sid Lassick)
One Flew Over the Cuckoo's Nest (1975) as Charlie Cheswick
Carrie (1976) as Mr. Fromm
The Happy Hooker Goes to Washington (1977) as Percy Bowlder
The Billion Dollar Hobo (1977) as Mitchell
Bunco (1977, TV Movie)
China 9, Liberty 37 (1978) as sheriff's friend
Greatest Heroes of the Bible (1978, TV mini series) as King Agadiz
The Cracker Factory (1979) (TV) as Ernie
Hot Stuff (1979) as Hymie
Skatetown, U.S.A. (1979) as Murray
1941 (1979) as Salesman (uncredited)
Alligator (1980) as Luke Gutchel (as Sidney Lassick)
The Unseen (1980) as Ernest Keller
History of the World: Part I (1981) as Applecore Vendor
Pandemonium (1982) as Man in Bus Station 
Partners (1982) as Photo Shoot Assistant (uncredited)
Fast-Walking (1982) as Ted
Forty Days of Musa Dagh (1982) as Osman
Silent Madness (1984) as Sheriff Liggett
Night Patrol (1984) as Peeping Tom (as Sidney Lassick)
Monaco Forever (1984) as American Tourist
Stitches (1985) as Sheldon Mendlebaum
Ratboy (1986) as Lee 'Dial-A-Prayer'
Body Slam (1987) as Shapiro
Lady in White (1988) as Mr. Lowry
The Further Adventures of Tennessee Buck (1988) as Wolfgang Meyer
Sonny Boy (1989) as Charlie P.
Out on Bail (1989) as Otis T. Smiley
Curse II: The Bite (1989) as George
Tale of Two Sisters (1989) as Dad
Judgement (1989) as Dr. Henry Silver
Pacific Palisades (1990) as Mr. Beer
Smoothtalker (1990) as Mr. Nathan
Wishful Thinking (1990) as Dr. Harding
Committed (1991) as Gow
Don't Tell Mom the Babysitter's Dead (1991) as Franklin
The Art of Dying (1991) as Wallie
Shakes the Clown (1991) as Peppy the Clown
Cool as Ice (1991) as Roscoe
Deep Cover (1992) as Gopher
Judgement (1992) as Dr. Henry Silver
Miracle Beach (1992) as Tooth Fairy
Tom and Jerry: The Movie (1992) as Straycatcher #2 (voice)
Eye of the Stranger (1993) as Oli
Sister Act 2: Back in the Habit (1993) as Competition Announcer
Future Shock (1994) as Mr. Johnson
Freeway (1996) as Woody Wilson
Johns (1996) as Al
Squanderers (1996) as Peter Chisholm
American Vampire (1997) as Bruno
Man on the Moon (1999) as Crystal Healer
Something to Sing About (2000) as Elderly Man (final film role)

Notable TV guest appearances
Serpico as Goldman in episode 1.0: "The Deadly Game", 24 April 1976
The Man from Atlantis as Smith in episode 1.7: "The Hawk of Mu", 18 October 1977
Eight Is Enough as Mr. Kaminsky in episode 2.6: "Dark Horse", 26 October 1977
Baretta in episode 4.8: "Who Can Make the Sun Shine?", 30 November 1977
Tabitha as Warlock in episode 1.9: "What's Wrong with Mister Right?", 31 December 1977
Kaz in episode 1.7: "Which Side Are You On?", 5 November 1978
Barney Miller
as Mr. Cummings in episode 5.11: "Toys", 14 December 1978
as Victor Carse (as Sidney Lassick, in episode 6.22: "Fog", 8 May 1980
Archie Bunker's Place as Sid in episode 3.4: "Harry's Investment", 25 October 1981 and in episode 3.3: "The Date", 11 October 1981
Gloria as Dr. Montego in episode 1.20: "Class Struggle", 3 April 1983
Matt Houston as Brady in episode 2.5: "Needle in a Haystack", 7 October 1983
Night Court as Leo in episode 2.4: "Pick a Number", 25 October 1984
Amazing Stories as Walter Poindexter in episode 1.10: "Remote Control Man", 8 December 1985
Moonlighting as Neighbor in episode 2.11: "The Bride of Tupperman", 14 January 1986
Gabriel's Fire as Liebowitz in episode 1.19: "One Flew Over the Bird's Nest", 17 April 1991
On the Air as Mr. Zoblotnick in episodes 1.7 & 1.4, 1992
Dream On as Mr. Janovic in episode 4.18: "Martin Tupper in 'Magnum Farce'", 16 February 1994
The X-Files as Chuck Forsch in episode 4.22: "Elegy", 4 May 1997

References

External links

1922 births
2003 deaths
Male actors from Chicago
American male film actors
American male television actors
Jewish American male actors
Deaths from diabetes
American people of Russian-Jewish descent
Burials at Mount Sinai Memorial Park Cemetery
20th-century American male actors
DePaul University alumni
United States Navy personnel of World War II
20th-century American Jews
21st-century American Jews